Robert Bruggeman (born March 21, 1986) is a former American football center. He was signed by the Tampa Bay Buccaneers as an undrafted free agent in 2009. He played college football at Iowa.

He has also been a member of the Atlanta Falcons.

Early years
Bruggeman went to high school at Washington High School in Cedar Rapids, Iowa, where he earned the nickname "Big Frame" and three varsity letters playing both offensive and defensive line.

During his sophomore year, Rob garnered honorable mention All-Mississippi Valley Conference honors.

During his junior and senior seasons, Bruggeman earned first-team All-Conference distinction as well as elite first team All-State honors. Bruggeman also helped the Warriors post a 21-2 record over those two years, with one loss coming at the end of each season. He was high school teammates with New Orleans Saints wide receiver Adrian Arrington.

College career
After a highly successful high school career, Rob decided to attend the University of Iowa as a preferred walk-on with teammate Gavin McGrath in 2004.

After redshirting during his first year with the Hawkeyes in 2004, Rob saw action in games against Ball State and Minnesota during the 2005 season. Injuries limited his playing time in 2006, but Bruggeman was able to contribute in several games towards the end of 2007. Though he was unable to play in the first 9 games of the season due to injury, Bruggeman saw action against Northwestern, Minnesota, and Western Michigan to end the Hawkeyes' 2007 campaign.

Iowa's 2008 season turned out to be a formative one for Bruggeman, starting with first-string center designation from Iowa head coach Kirk Ferentz following spring practice. Bruggeman started every game at center for the Hawkeyes in 2008, including their resounding Outback Bowl victory over the South Carolina Gamecocks.

Bruggeman earned first team District Seven Academic All-America honors and Academic All-Big Ten accolades following his senior season.  He was named to the second team All-Big Ten list by the league’s coaches and media.

Professional career

Pre-draft
After playing at center for the Hawkeyes, Bruggeman was one of 330 players invited to the NFL Scouting Combine. Because of a lingering injury, Bruggeman opted not to participate in the running drills at the combine, but did post an impressive 30 reps of 225 pounds in the bench press exercise, good for 10th best among offensive linemen and 19th best among all combine participants. He later improved his measurables at the Iowa Pro Day.

Tampa Bay Buccaneers
After going undrafted during the 2009 NFL Draft, Bruggeman was signed to a free agent deal by the Tampa Bay Buccaneers on May 1, 2009. He played in all four pre-season games. He was waived by the Buccaneers in September 2009.

Atlanta Falcons
The Atlanta Falcons signed Bruggeman as a free agent on September 7, 2009. He was added to the Falcons' practice squad on September 8. After his contract expired following the season, Bruggeman was signed to a future contract on January 4, 2010. He was waived on September 12, 2011.

Kansas City Chiefs
The Chiefs added Bruggeman to their practice squad on November 29, 2011, one day after waiving Jared Gaither and promoting David Sims from the practice squad to the 53-man roster.

References

External links

Atlanta Falcons bio
Tampa Bay Buccaneers bio
Iowa Hawkeyes bio

1986 births
Living people
Sportspeople from Cedar Rapids, Iowa
Players of American football from Iowa
American football centers
Iowa Hawkeyes football players
Tampa Bay Buccaneers players
Atlanta Falcons players